Wardlaw Junior High School, also known as Wardlaw Middle School, is a historic Middle school located at Columbia, South Carolina. It was built in 1926–1927, and is a three-story, rectangular brick structure with a central courtyard. It features Gothic window tracery, arched entrances with one-story porches, and decorative cast stone panels. It was the first junior high school building in South Carolina.

It was added to the National Register of Historic Places in 1984.

References

School buildings on the National Register of Historic Places in South Carolina
School buildings completed in 1927
Buildings and structures in Columbia, South Carolina
National Register of Historic Places in Columbia, South Carolina
1927 establishments in South Carolina